Badr bin Saud bin Harab al Busaidi is an Omani politician, currently Minister Responsible For Defense since at least 2004.

References

External links

Living people
Defense ministers of Oman
Year of birth missing (living people)
Place of birth missing (living people)